Chris DeWolfe (born ) is an American technology entrepreneur. He co-founded Myspace in 2003 and was its chief executive officer (CEO) until 2009. DeWolfe has been the CEO of Jam City, a video game developer, since he co-founded it in 2010.

Early life and education 
DeWolfe is a native of Portland, Oregon, and went to Lincoln High School. DeWolfe graduated BA from the University of Washington in 1988, then completed an MBA at the USC Marshall School of Business in 1997. He was honored by the school as Alumni Entrepreneur of the Year in 2006.

Career

Myspace 

DeWolfe conceived Myspace while taking a course titled "The Impact of Tech on Media and Entertainment" during the final year of his MBA program. In the final project for his class, DeWolfe created "Sitegeist", which had elements of Citysearch and Match.com mixed with instant messaging. DeWolfe got an "A" on his project and used it as inspiration in creating Myspace. He co-founded Myspace in 2003.

During DeWolfe's tenure, Myspace grew to attract over 135 million worldwide visitors a month. On April 22, 2009, News Corporation announced that DeWolfe would step down as CEO to become a strategic adviser and serve on the board of Myspace China. Former Facebook executive Owen Van Natta replaced him.

Jam City 

DeWolfe is a co-founder and the CEO of Jam City, a Los Angeles-based video game developer. The inspiration for Jam City came during DeWolfe’s days at Myspace. In a 2006 trip DeWolfe made to Japan, he met with SoftBank Group founder Masayoshi Son, where the two discussed gaming and the potential of mobile gaming. The social nature of games and the fast growth of mobile gaming in countries like Japan inspired him to start Jam City. DeWolfe founded Jam City in 2010 with former 20th Century Fox executive Josh Yguado and former Myspace executives Colin Digiaro and Aber Whitcomb when they received backing from Austin Ventures to buy the gaming startup MindJolt. Under DeWolfe's leadership, Jam City has grown to more than 825 employees and nine studios, as of May 2021. Its games, which include Harry Potter: Hogwarts Mystery, Cookie Jam, Panda Pop, Disney Emoji Blitz, and Family Guy: The Quest for Stuff, have been downloaded 1.3 billion times and Jam City reached a deal to become a public company through a merger with DPCM Capital Inc., with a $1.2 billion valuation.

Accolades 
In 2006, DeWolfe was named one of Times 100 most influential people in the world. In 2007, he was chosen by Barbara Walters as one of her 10 most fascinating people and he won the Producers Guild of America's Vanguard Award in 2009.

Other roles 
DeWolfe is an investor in the travel site Gogobot. He served on the board of trustees of the Los Angeles County Museum of Art and is on the board of directors for Woven Digital.

Personal life 
DeWolfe lives in Los Angeles. He has two children.

References

External links 

American technology chief executives
Businesspeople from Los Angeles
Businesspeople from Portland, Oregon
Living people
Marshall School of Business alumni
Myspace
University of Washington alumni
Year of birth missing (living people)